Darja Varfolomeev (born 4 November 2006) is a German rhythmic gymnast. She is the 2022 Rhythmic Gymnastics World Champion with Clubs and All-around Silver Medalist.

Career

Early life 
Darja was born in Barnaul, Russia. Her Grandfather is originally from Germany, which is why she holds both Russian and German citizenship. She started Rhythmic Gymnastics at a young age in Russia but moved to Germany in 2018. She’s coached by Olympic Silver Medalist Yulia Raskina.

Junior 
At the first Junior World Championships in Rhythmic Gymnastics in Moscow in 2019, she placed 15th in the team event with Margarita Kolosov. She also placed 15th in Clubs Qualifications, which was the only apparatus she competed with.

Senior 
She debuted in the senior category in 2022, at World Cup Tashkent, where she won bronze medal in All-around. She took another bronze medal in Hoop final, two silver in Ball and Ribbon finals and placed 4th with Clubs. On May 20-22, she competed at World Challenge Cup Pamplona where she took 4th place in All-around. She also won two gold medals in Ball and Ribbon finals, and took 4th place in Clubs final. Darja continued collecting medals at World Challenge Cup Portimão, where she won silver in All-around behind Israeli Adi Asya Katz. She took three more medals in Finals - two gold with Ball and Clubs, and one silver with Hoop. In June she competed at the European Championships in Tel Aviv, along Kolosov, the senior group and the two juniors Lada Pusch and Anna-Maria Shatokhin, she won two bronze medals in the ball and clubs finals. In late August she took part in the World Cup in Cluj-Napoca, being 6th in the All-Around, 4th with ball and 4th with clubs. Darja was also selected for the World Championships in Sofia along Kolosov and the senior group, there she made history by winning gold in the clubs final, silver in the All-Around, in the team category and with ball as well as bronze with hoop.

In 2023 she showed her clubs routine in the italian clubs championship' first stage, where she competed for Motto Viareggio. After a foot operation in December 2022, Darja competed with only two apparatuses in the Fellnach-Schmiden Tournament, she won gold in both the ball and clubs finals.

Achievements 

 First German rhythmic gymnast to win a medal in an individual apparatus final at European Championships since 1980, making her the first German rhythmic gymnast to medal in an individual apparatus final at European Championships after the reunification of Germany.
 First German rhythmic gymnast to win two medals in individual apparatus finals at European Championships.
 First German rhythmic gymnast to win a medal in an individual apparatus final at World Championships since 1977, making her the first German rhythmic gymnast to medal at World Championships after the reunification of Germany.
 First German rhythmic gymnast to win a gold medal in an individual apparatus final at World Championships since 1975, making her the first German rhythmic gymnast to become a World Champion after the reunification of Germany.
 First German rhythmic gymnast to win a medal in an all-around final at World Championships since 1975, making her the first German rhythmic gymnast to achieve this after the reunification of Germany.

Routine music information

Competitive highlights
(Team competitions in seniors are held only at the World Championships, Europeans and other Continental Games.)

References

External links
 
 

2006 births
Living people
German rhythmic gymnasts
People from Barnaul
Medalists at the Rhythmic Gymnastics European Championships
Medalists at the Rhythmic Gymnastics World Championships
21st-century German women
German people of Russian descent
Volga German people